Hugo Pérez Balderas (born 16 December 2002) is a Spanish footballer who plays as a central defender for Villarreal CF B.

Club career
Pérez was born in Barcelona, Catalonia, and joined RCD Espanyol's youth setup in 2014, after representing EF Gavà and UE Cornellà. He left the former in 2017, and finished his formation with Deportivo Alavés.

Pérez made his senior debut with the reserves on 1 November 2020, playing the last 16 minutes in a 3–0 Segunda División B away loss against Racing de Santander. He left the club in 2022, and subsequently joined Villarreal CF's C-team in Tercera Federación shortly after.

Pérez made his professional debut with Villarreal CF B on 7 October 2022, starting in a 3–1 away loss against Sporting de Gijón in the Segunda División.

Personal life
Pérez's father Raúl was also a footballer and a defender. He played mainly in the third tier, only appearing professionally with Elche CF and Ciudad de Murcia.

References

External links

2002 births
Living people
Footballers from Barcelona
Spanish footballers
Association football defenders
Segunda División players
Segunda División B players
Tercera Federación players
Deportivo Alavés B players
Villarreal CF C players
Villarreal CF B players